The Forest and Environment Research, Development and Innovation Agency (literal Indonesian: Badan Penelitian, Pengembangan, dan Inovasi Hutan dan Lingkungan Hidup), officially named Research, Development, and Innovation Agency (Indonesian: Badan Penelitian, Pengembangan, dan Inovasi, BLI) of the Ministry of Environment and Forestry (Indonesian: Kementerian Lingkungan Hidup dan Kehutanan, Kemen LHK). The agency nationally known as BLI, while internationally known as FORDA-MOF. The agency was a supporting unit of the Ministry of Environment and Forestry. The agency was responsible for performing researches on environmental sciences, climate change and its mitigation, and forestry in Indonesia.

The agency was targeted to be disbanded and replaced with National Research and Innovation Agency (Indonesian: Badan Riset dan Inovasi Nasional, BRIN). The agency had been disbanded de jure after the issuance of Presidential Decree No. 92/2020 on 14 September 2020, which ordered the research units of BLI/FORDA-MOF to be relinquished to BRIN and the large part of the agency converted into Environment and Forestry Instrumentation Standardization Agency (Indonesian: Badan Standarisasi Instrumen Lingkungan Hidup dan Kehutanan, BSI LHK). Despite that, the transitional provision of the decree permitted the research centers/units under the former BLI/FORDA-MOF to be temporarily operated and supervised by BSI LHK until the integration to BRIN finalized. On 1 July 2021, the agency was confirmed to be dissolved de facto and replaced by BSI LHK thru Ministry of Environment and Forestry Decree No. 15/2021.

History

Foundation History 
The BLI foundation can be traced back to late 19th century to early 20th century during Dutch colonial era. On 1 July 1897, Het Boswezen van Nederlandsch Oost Indie (literal English: Forest Service of Netherlands West Indies Government) was founded as one of 16 children agencies of Dutch colonial government's Departement van Landbouw, Nijverheid en Handel (Department of Agriculture, Industry, and Trade). The department was colonial predecessor of the current Indonesian Ministry of Agriculture, Ministry of Industry, and Ministry of Trade. The department at that time was a large quasi-governmental agency within the Dutch colonial government which possessed vast powers and responsibilities which regulated, provided, and researched various subjects in agriculture, agricultural extension, agricultural education, management of Bogor Botanical Gardens, fishery, husbandry, ranches and pastures management, veterinary services and veterinary education, management of state coffee plantations, forestry, industries, trades, metrology, and also managed and coordinated local government agricultural services and units, to even control, supervision, regulation, and registration of Dutch East Indies natural societies. The Forest Service was a unit founded within the department to regulate and manage Indonesian forest at that time, although the activity was focused to forests at Java and Madura islands. However, the forestry at that time was used by colonial government as tool for exploiting natural resources for people welfare and their activities much industrial-oriented. Despite that, the agency researches in hydrology, orology, and climatology were contributed to early researches on these topics which later become the foundational basis of later earth science and environmental sciences in Indonesia.

On 16 May 1913, Proefstation Voor Het Boswezen (English: Forestry Research Station) formed within the Het Boswezen van Nederlandsch Oost Indie thru Gouvernement Besluit No. 58. The unit was initially consisted of 4 research centers: Forestry Research Division, Plantation Division, Forest Exploration and Prospecting Division, Wood Technology Division. In 1927, the Proefstation Voor Het Boswezen renamed to Bosbouwproefstation (English: Forestry Research Station, same translation). Until the start of World War II, the agency was expanded and finally having 6 divisions: Wild Forest Wood Business Division, Forest Exploration Station, Experimental Forest Products Development Division, Forest Plants Experimental Division, Water Research Division, and Propaganda for Forest Products Utilization and Promotion Division.

On 1942, Japan occupied Dutch East Indies. At that time, the Empire of Japan government sent Professor Ryozo Kanehira  to Dutch East Indies and set him up as Director of Bosbouwproefstation. The Bosbouwproefstation renamed into Ringyoo Sikenzyoo (English: Forestry Research Station) under his leadership. During his time, the agency research was shifted to war purposes and researching wood technologies for supporting war, such as development of gunpowder and explosives, inventarization of hardwood for shipbuilding, air plane building, gun making, match production, developing natural tanning agents, etc. When Japan finally surrendered on 15 August 1945, the agency later relinquished to Indonesian government on 17 August 1945, at the same day of Indonesian Proclamation of Independence. The first Indonesian director was M. Soetarmo Hardjowarsono, and he renamed the agency name to Badan Penyelidikan Kehutanan (English: Forestry Research Agency). 

The agency later went into many names and attached to many ministries, until in 2015 it become Research, Development, and Innovation Agency (Indonesian: Badan Penelitian, Pengembangan, dan Inovasi, BLI after the issue of Ministry of Environment and Forestry Decree No. P. 18/MENLHK-II/2015.

Dissolution 
After the passage of Law of National Science and Technology System (Law No. 11/2019) and Omnibus Law on Job Creation (Law No. 11/2020), Siti Nurbaya Bakar, the Minister of Environment and Forestry announced that BLI will be phased out on 16 July 2020. The research units of BLI will be relinquished to newly formed BRIN, and the large part of the former BLI will turned into BSI LHK. On 14 September 2020, the agency was dissolved de jure by Presidential Decree No. 92/2020 and replaced by BSI LHK. The ministry confirmed again the dissolution thru Ministry of Environment and Forestry Decree No. 15/2021.

Integration to BRIN 
Despite the dissolution, the transitional provision of the decree permitted the research centers/units under the former BLI/FORDA-MOF to be temporarily operated and supervised by BSI LHK until the integration to BRIN finalized. As in 2021, the integration progress is still ongoing.

Structure 
The Structure of the agency was outlined by Ministry of Environment and Forestry Decree No. P. 18/MENLHK-II/2015:

 Office of the Head of BLI
 BLI Secretariat
 Division of Programs and Cooperation
 Subdivision of Programs
 Subdivision of Financial Planning
 Subdivision of Cooperation
 Division of Evaluation, Dissemination, and Book Affairs
 Subdivision of Data and Information
 Subdivision of Evaluation and Reporting
 Subdivision of Dissemination, Publication, and Library Affairs
 Division of Employee, Law, Organization, and Administration Affairs
 Subdivision of Employee Administration
 Subdivision of Functionaries Affairs
 Subdivision of Law, Organization, and Administration Affairs
 Division of Finance and General Affairs 
 Subdivision of Administration Affairs
 Subdivision of Financial Administration Affairs
 Subdivision of Equipment
 Center for Forestry Research and Development
 Center for Forest Product Research and Development
 Center for Environmental Quality Development and Environmental Laboratories Research and Development
 Center for Social, Economy, Policies and Climate Change Research and Development
Besides these centers, the agency has several branch units. After BLI/FORDA-MOF dissolution, these units temporarily under BSI LHK.

 Research and Development Institute of Forest Plants Fiber Technology Kuok, Riau
 Research and Development Institute of Agroforestry Technology Ciamis, West Java
 Research and Development Institute of Biotechnology Research and Plant Breeding Yogyakarta
 Research and Development Institute of Watershed Management and Technology Development Solo, Central Java
 Research and Development Institute of Environment and Forestry Banjarbaru, South Kalimantan
 Research and Development Institute of Natural Resources Conservation Technology Samboja, East Kalimantan
 Research and Development Institute of Dipterocarps Rainforest Ecosystem Samarinda, East Kalimantan
 Research and Development Institute of Technology for Non-timber Forest Product Mataram, West Nusa Tenggara
 Research and Development Institute for Environment and Forestry Aek Nauli, North Sumatra
 Research and Development Institute for Environment and Forestry Palembang, South Sumatra
 Research and Development Institute for Environment and Forestry Makassar, South Sulawesi
 Research and Development Institute for Environment and Forestry Kupang, East Nusa Tenggara
 Research and Development Institute for Environment and Forestry Manado, North Sulawesi
 Research and Development Institute for Environment and Forestry Manokwari, West Papua

References 

1913 establishments in the Dutch East Indies
2020 disestablishments in Indonesia
Science and technology in Indonesia

Research institutes in Indonesia